MPM may refer to:

Biology
 MPM (psychedelic), a psychedelic drug
 Malignant Pleural Mesothelioma
 Matrix population models

Computing and technology
 MPM (automobile), an automobile built in Mount Pleasant, Michigan, 1914–1915
 MP/M (Multi-Programming Monitor Control Program), a Digital Research operating system
 Manufacturing process management, to define how products are to be manufactured
 Manufacturing Programming Mode, a configuration mode of the BIOS on some HP computers
 Material point method, a numerical technique to simulate the behavior of solids, liquids, gases
 Microwave Power Module, a microwave device to amplify radio frequency signals
 Request processing modes, a feature of the Apache HTTP Server
 Apache MultiProcessing Modules, part of the Apache HTTP Server architecture

Education
 Master of Project Management, a graduate degree
 Master of Public Management
 Master of Science in Project Management

Other uses
 Maputo International Airport (IATA code: MPM), in Maputo, Mozambique
 Marginal propensity to import
 Measures per minute, a measure of musical tempo
 Metra potential method, a means of describing, organizing, and planning a project
 Mid-Pacific Mountains, an oceanic plateau in the Pacific Ocean
 Milwaukee Public Museum
 Moviment Patrijotti Maltin, a Maltese anti-immigration political party
 Movimiento Peronista Montonero, Argentine guerrilla group the Montoneros
 Mysore Paper Mills, at Bhadravathi in the Shimoga district of Karnataka state, India